Bear Wallow, Kentucky may refer to:

Bear Wallow, Barren County, Kentucky, an unincorporated community
Bear Wallow, Morgan County, Kentucky, an unincorporated community
Bear Wallow, Washington County, Kentucky, an unincorporated community